is a Japanese child actor and TV personality.

Filmography

TV dramas 
 Tonbi　- Yasuo Ichikawa (child) (TBS / 2013)
 Ashita, Mama ga Inai - Nippachi (Nippon TV / 2014)
 Hotel Concierge (ep.1) - Tsubasa Kaiho (TBS / 2015)
 ABU Asian Children's Drama Shortcut to Brazil - Riku (NHK ETV / 2015) 
 5-ji Kara 9-ji Made: Watashi ni Koi Shita Obōsan - Sankyu Naha (Fuji TV / 2015) 
 NHK BS　Historical drama Oookaechizen3 (ep.2) - Sannosuke (NHK BS / 2016) 
 OUR HOUSE - Shintaro Ban (Fuji TV / 2016) 
 Saturday drama The Sniffer Japanese (ep.5) - Youichi Kashima (NHK / 2016) 
 NHK Taiga drama　Naotora: The Lady Warlord - Toramatsu (child) (NHK / 2017)

Films 
 Twilight Sasara Saya (2014), Daiya
 L DK (2014), Kota Hoshino
 My Dad is a Heel Wrestler (2018), Shōta
 The Great Yokai War: Guardians (2021), Kei Watanabe
 Fullmetal Alchemist: The Revenge of Scar (2022), Selim
 Fullmetal Alchemist: The Final Alchemy (2022), Selim

Japanese dub
 Home Alone 3 (2019 NTV edition), Alex Pruitt (Alex D. Linz)

Narration 
 NHK BS Premium Huge Glacier Annihilation: America Five large lake Niagara waterfall (2015, NHK BS)
 NHK Great Earth Vanuatu Bodily sensation！Furious Volcano (2016, NHK)

Music programs 
 どぅんつくぱ〜Time of music〜 MC Kokoro kun (Fuji TV/2014)

Information programs 
 Hirunandesu! (Nippon TV) Occasional Appearance
 syumi doki! Kokoro's dog cram school〜Can read the air Aim for a dog!〜 student (NHK ETV / 2016)

Other 
 EN MAN SOM HETER OVE/A MAN CALLED OVE Preview Event (2016)　
 Netflix Original drama Fuller House Season2 Japan Premier Event (2016)　
 Rio Suzuki Dance shinai？ Release Event (2016)　
 Ito Yokado osechi 2017 PR Event (2016)　
 wisteria pharmacy Good teeth declaration at Brian PR Event (2016) 
 66th NHK Kōhaku Uta Gassen Fuyumi Sakamoto co-starring (2015) 
 Ryuzo and the Seven Henchmen DVD＆Blu-ray Release Event (2015) 
 5 Seconds of Summer/She's Kinda Hot Japan version MV (2015) 
 belle and sebastian talk show (2015) 
 kooky　Director＆starring Visiting Japan Commemoration Event (2015) 
 TOKYO GIRLS COLLECTION 2015 AUTUMN／WINTER (2015) 
 Mezamashi TV Halloween Event T-SPOOK (2014)

Awards 
 Seattle International Children's Film Festival 2016, Child Jury Award (ABU Asian Children's Drama Shortcut to Brazil) 
 2015 55th ACC CM FESTIVAL Craft award film Department acting award (Toto Ltd. NEOREST)

References

External links 
 Official agency profile 

2008 births
Living people
Actors from Aichi Prefecture
Japanese male child actors
Japanese television personalities
21st-century Japanese male actors